Toni Maree Cronk (born 27 March 1980 in Bankstown, New South Wales) is a field hockey goalkeeper from Australia, who made her debut for the Australian women's national team in October 2001 in the test series against New Zealand in Melbourne. Nicknamed Cronky she was a member of the Hockeyroos at the 2004 Summer Olympics in Athens, Greece and the 2012 Summer Olympics in London, Great Britain.  The team ended up in fifth place in the overall-rankings on both occasions.

External links
 
Hockey Australia Profile
 

1980 births
Living people
Australian female field hockey players
Female field hockey goalkeepers
Olympic field hockey players of Australia
Field hockey players at the 2004 Summer Olympics
Field hockey players at the 2006 Commonwealth Games
People from New South Wales
Commonwealth Games gold medallists for Australia
Field hockey players at the 2012 Summer Olympics
Commonwealth Games medallists in field hockey
Field hockey players at the 2010 Commonwealth Games
Medallists at the 2006 Commonwealth Games
Medallists at the 2010 Commonwealth Games